West 10 LDN was a one-off BBC Three youth drama, written and created by Noel Clarke and directed by Menhaj Huda, first broadcast on 10 March 2008. The screenplay was based on the novel Society Within, a short story collection by Courttia Newland. The film was the second collaboration between Clarke and Huda, following their work on Kidulthood, which gave Huda the idea for a television series based upon a similar format. West 10 LDN is set entirely in the fictional Greenside council housing estate in West London, which in reality, is the White City Estate. Ashley Madekwe and Duane Henry served as lead actors for the project.

West 10 LDN was produced by the award-winning Kudos Film & Television, who had enjoyed recent success with Life On Mars, Spooks and Hustle. Tim Cole was assigned as producer and Derek Wax served as executive producer Derek Wax. West 10 LDN was broadcast as part of BBC Three's Drama Pilot Season, in which six different one-hour pilots were broadcast, with the highest-rated going on to be developed into a six-part series.

Although it received critical acclaim from fans of Kidulthood and Adulthood alike, Noel Clarke later confirmed on his official MySpace page that the then controllers of BBC Three, Danny Cohen and Jane Tranter, had made the decision not to commission West 10 LDN into a full series.

Plot
Nineteen-year-old Elisha (Ashley Madekwe), her mother and sister arrive on the Greenside estate, ready to move into their new flat, after their last flat was burnt down whilst they were visiting Elisha's father's grave. Whilst moving in, a box of Elisha's stuff is stolen from their car by a local thug. She immediately accuses Valerie (Chi Kolo) and her group of friends, but soon discover they were not involved. In the process, however, she becomes friends with Valerie - who offers to help her get her box back. At the local youth club, Elisha attempts to identify the thief - but finds herself immersed in a world of crazy socialism, run by Lacey (Ashley Walters) and Michael (Noel Clarke), and fame-seeking DJ Nathan (Adam Deacon). Meanwhile, local gang member Orin (Duane Henry) believes he has hit the jackpot when he recovers a stash of drugs dropped during a police arrest.

However, his best friend Will (Andre Squire), is not so sure, but soon sets up a deal with local drug dealer Maverick (Nick Nevern), who offers the pair £1600 for the stash. Unlucky for them, the owners of the stash are on their tail - and they want their drugs back. After not having any luck at the youth club, Valerie and Elisha meet up with Val's boyfriend Ray (Fraser Ayres), who offers to help Elisha get her box back - and directs the pair to local Turkish pimp Gout (Tamer Hassan). After Gout fails to cough up the goods, Elisha decides to steal her own stuff back. As Valerie and Elisha attempt to escape the wrath of Gout, they come across Orin and Will being beaten by the owners of the stash - and with the help of a cup of foundation, manage to save them from being beaten to death. Orin owes his life to Elisha - and soon, a relationship between the pair begins to blossom.

Cast

 Ashley Madekwe as Elisha
 Duane Henry as Orin
 Chi Kolo as Valerie
 John Joseph as Will
 Noel Clarke as Michael
 Ashley Walters as Lacey
 Fraser Ayres as Ray
 Tamer Hassan as Gout
 Adam Deacon as Nathan
 Nick Nevern as Maverick
 Kyla Frye as Tawanda
 Suzette Llewellyn as Veronica
 Mikel Ameen as Little Stacey
 Jacob Anderson as Benji
 Madeleine Fairley as Lillian
 Kamara Bacchus as Leonora
 La Charné Jolly as Sissy
 Kyle Summercorn as Johnny
 Josef Altin as Ratty
 Latoya Lees as Carolin
 Nicôle Lecky as Danielle
 Demi Oyediran as Beth
 Imdad Miah as Mohammed
 Joseph Makain as Jerome
 Nina Wadia as Clerk

References

External links

West 10 LDN on Myspace
West 10 LDN group on Facebook
West 10 LDN on YouTube

Black British television shows
BBC television dramas
British teen drama television series
Television films as pilots
Television shows set in London
Youth culture in the United Kingdom
2008 television films
2008 films
Films with screenplays by Noel Clarke
Hood films
Black British mass media
Black British films
Films directed by Menhaj Huda
Television pilots not picked up as a series
British television films